Womé may refer to:

People
 Dové Womé (born 1991), Togolese footballer
 Pierre Womé (born 1979), Cameroonian footballer

Places
 Womey, Guinea (alternate spelling)